Good Fortune in Ohio is a 1950 West German comedy film directed by Heinz Paul and starring Hermann Brix, Edith Prager and Loni Heuser.

Cast
 Hermann Brix as Gustl Kreuder
 Edith Prager as Kathrin, seine Frau
 Loni Heuser as Fanny Schulz
 Josef Sieber as Ottokar Schulz
 Paul Henckels as Direktor Hasenkamp
 Adolf Gondrell as C.O. Klotz
 Helmuth Rudolph as Herkules
 Linda Caroll as Patricia

References

Bibliography 
 Goble, Alan. The Complete Index to Literary Sources in Film. Walter de Gruyter, 1999.

External links 
 

1950 films
West German films
German comedy films
1950 comedy films
1950s German-language films
Films directed by Heinz Paul
German black-and-white films
1950s German films